Tülü (also, Tuli and Tyuli) is a village in the Lerik Rayon of Azerbaijan.  The village forms part of the municipality of Coni.

References 

Populated places in Lerik District